

Peerage of England, Scotland and Great Britain

Dukes

|colspan=5 style="background: #fcc" align="center"|Peerage of England
|-
|Duke of Cornwall (1337)||George, Prince of Wales||1762||1820||
|-
|rowspan=2|Duke of Norfolk (1483)||Edward Howard, 9th Duke of Norfolk||1732||1777||Died
|-
|Charles Howard, 10th Duke of Norfolk||1777||1786||
|-
|Duke of Somerset (1547)||Edward Seymour, 9th Duke of Somerset||1757||1792||
|-
|Duke of Cleveland (1670)||William FitzRoy, 3rd Duke of Cleveland||1730||1774||Died, title extinct
|-
|Duke of Richmond (1675)||Charles Lennox, 3rd Duke of Richmond||1750||1806||
|-
|Duke of Grafton (1675)||Augustus FitzRoy, 3rd Duke of Grafton||1757||1811||
|-
|Duke of Beaufort (1682)||Henry Somerset, 5th Duke of Beaufort||1756||1803||
|-
|Duke of St Albans (1684)||George Beauclerk, 3rd Duke of St Albans||1751||1786||
|-
|Duke of Bolton (1689)||Harry Powlett, 6th Duke of Bolton||1765||1794||
|-
|Duke of Leeds (1694)||Thomas Osborne, 4th Duke of Leeds||1731||1789||
|-
|rowspan=2|Duke of Bedford (1694)||John Russell, 4th Duke of Bedford||1732||1771||Died
|-
|Francis Russell, 5th Duke of Bedford||1771||1802||
|-
|Duke of Devonshire (1694)||William Cavendish, 5th Duke of Devonshire||1764||1811||
|-
|Duke of Marlborough (1702)||George Spencer, 4th Duke of Marlborough||1758||1817||
|-
|rowspan=2|Duke of Rutland (1703)||John Manners, 3rd Duke of Rutland||1721||1779||Died
|-
|Charles Manners, 4th Duke of Rutland||1779||1787||
|-
|colspan=5 style="background: #fcc" align="center"|Peerage of Scotland
|-
|Duke of Hamilton (1643)||Douglas Hamilton, 8th Duke of Hamilton||1769||1799||
|-
|Duke of Buccleuch (1663)||Henry Scott, 3rd Duke of Buccleuch||1751||1812||
|-
|rowspan=2|Duke of Queensberry (1684)||Charles Douglas, 3rd Duke of Queensberry||1711||1778||Died
|-
|William Douglas, 4th Duke of Queensberry||1778||1810||
|-
|Duke of Gordon (1684)||Alexander Gordon, 4th Duke of Gordon||1752||1827||
|-
|rowspan=2|Duke of Argyll (1701)||John Campbell, 4th Duke of Argyll||1761||1770||Died
|-
|John Campbell, 5th Duke of Argyll||1770||1806||
|-
|rowspan=2|Duke of Atholl (1703)||John Murray, 3rd Duke of Atholl||1764||1774||Died
|-
|John Murray, 4th Duke of Atholl||1774||1830||
|-
|Duke of Montrose (1707)||William Graham, 2nd Duke of Montrose||1742||1790||
|-
|Duke of Roxburghe (1707)||John Ker, 3rd Duke of Roxburghe||1755||1804||
|-
|colspan=5 style="background: #fcc" align="center"|Peerage of Great Britain
|-
|rowspan=3|Duke of Ancaster and Kesteven (1715)||Peregrine Bertie, 3rd Duke of Ancaster and Kesteven||1742||1778||Died
|-
|Robert Bertie, 4th Duke of Ancaster and Kesteven||1778||1779||Died
|-
|Brownlow Bertie, 5th Duke of Ancaster and Kesteven||1779||1809||
|-
|Duke of Kingston-upon-Hull (1715)||Evelyn Pierrepont, 2nd Duke of Kingston-upon-Hull||1726||1773||Died, title extinct
|-
|Duke of Portland (1716)||William Cavendish-Bentinck, 3rd Duke of Portland||1762||1809||
|-
|Duke of Manchester (1719)||George Montagu, 4th Duke of Manchester||1762||1788||
|-
|rowspan=2|Duke of Chandos (1719)||Henry Brydges, 2nd Duke of Chandos||1744||1771||Died
|-
|James Brydges, 3rd Duke of Chandos||1771||1789||
|-
|Duke of Dorset (1720)||John Sackville, 3rd Duke of Dorset||1769||1799||
|-
|Duke of Bridgewater (1720)||Francis Egerton, 3rd Duke of Bridgewater||1748||1803||
|-
|Duke of Newcastle (1756)||Henry Pelham-Clinton, 2nd Duke of Newcastle||1768||1794||
|-
|Duke of Gloucester and Edinburgh (1764)||Prince William Henry, Duke of Gloucester and Edinburgh||1764||1805||
|-
|Duke of Northumberland (1766)||Hugh Percy, 1st Duke of Northumberland||1766||1786||
|-
|Duke of Cumberland and Strathearn (1766)||Prince Henry, Duke of Cumberland and Strathearn||1766||1790||
|-
|Duke of Montagu (1766)||George Montagu, 1st Duke of Montagu||1766||1790||
|-
|}

Marquesses

|colspan=5 style="background: #fcc" align="center"|Peerage of England
|-
|colspan=5 align="center"|-
|-
|colspan=5 style="background: #fcc" align="center"|Peerage of Scotland
|-
|rowspan=2|Marquess of Tweeddale (1694)||George Hay, 5th Marquess of Tweeddale||1762||1770||Died
|-
|George Hay, 6th Marquess of Tweeddale||1770||1787||
|-
|rowspan=2|Marquess of Lothian (1701)||William Kerr, 4th Marquess of Lothian||1767||1775||Died
|-
|William Kerr, 5th Marquess of Lothian||1775||1815||
|-
|Marquess of Annandale (1701)||George Vanden-Bempde, 3rd Marquess of Annandale||1730||1792||
|-
|colspan=5 style="background: #fcc" align="center"|Peerage of Great Britain
|-
|Marquess Grey (1740)||Jemima Yorke, 2nd Marchioness Grey||1740||1797||
|-
|Marquess of Rockingham (1746)||Charles Watson-Wentworth, 2nd Marquess of Rockingham||1750||1782||
|-
|}

Earls

|colspan=5 style="background: #fcc" align="center"|Peerage of England
|-
|Earl of Shrewsbury (1442)||George Talbot, 14th Earl of Shrewsbury||1743||1787||
|-
|rowspan=2|Earl of Derby (1485)||Edward Stanley, 11th Earl of Derby||1736||1776||Died
|-
|Edward Smith-Stanley, 12th Earl of Derby||1776||1834||
|-
|Earl of Huntingdon (1529)||Francis Hastings, 10th Earl of Huntingdon||1746||1789||
|-
|Earl of Pembroke (1551)||Henry Herbert, 10th Earl of Pembroke||1749||1794||
|-
|Earl of Devon (1553)||William Courtenay, de jure 8th Earl of Devon||1762||1788||
|-
|rowspan=3|Earl of Suffolk (1603)||Henry Howard, 12th Earl of Suffolk||1757||1779||Died
|-
|Henry Howard, 13th Earl of Suffolk||1779||1779||
|-
|Thomas Howard, 14th Earl of Suffolk||1779||1783||
|-
|Earl of Exeter (1605)||Brownlow Cecil, 9th Earl of Exeter||1754||1793||
|-
|Earl of Salisbury (1605)||James Cecil, 6th Earl of Salisbury||1728||1780||
|-
|Earl of Northampton (1618)||Spencer Compton, 8th Earl of Northampton||1763||1796||
|-
|Earl of Denbigh (1622)||Basil Feilding, 6th Earl of Denbigh||1755||1800||
|-
|rowspan=3|Earl of Westmorland (1624)||Thomas Fane, 8th Earl of Westmorland||1762||1771||Died
|-
|John Fane, 9th Earl of Westmorland||1771||1774||Died
|-
|John Fane, 10th Earl of Westmorland||1774||1841||
|-
|rowspan=2|Earl of Peterborough (1628)||Charles Mordaunt, 4th Earl of Peterborough||1735||1779||Died
|-
|Charles Henry Mordaunt, 5th Earl of Peterborough||1779||1814||
|-
|Earl of Stamford (1628)||George Grey, 5th Earl of Stamford||1768||1819||
|-
|Earl of Winchilsea (1628)||George Finch, 9th Earl of Winchilsea||1769||1826||
|-
|rowspan=2|Earl of Chesterfield (1628)||Philip Stanhope, 4th Earl of Chesterfield||1726||1773||Died
|-
|Philip Stanhope, 5th Earl of Chesterfield||1773||1815||
|-
|Earl of Thanet (1628)||Sackville Tufton, 8th Earl of Thanet||1753||1786||
|-
|Earl of Sandwich (1660)||John Montagu, 4th Earl of Sandwich||1729||1792||
|-
|Earl of Essex (1661)||William Capell, 4th Earl of Essex||1743||1799||
|-
|Earl of Carlisle (1661)||Frederick Howard, 5th Earl of Carlisle||1758||1825||
|-
|rowspan=2|Earl of Shaftesbury (1672)||Anthony Ashley Cooper, 4th Earl of Shaftesbury||1713||1771||Died
|-
|Anthony Ashley-Cooper, 5th Earl of Shaftesbury||1771||1811||
|-
|rowspan=2|Earl of Lichfield (1674)||George Lee, 3rd Earl of Lichfield||1742||1772||Died
|-
|Robert Lee, 4th Earl of Lichfield||1772||1776||Died, title extinct
|-
|Earl of Berkeley (1679)||Frederick Augustus Berkeley, 5th Earl of Berkeley||1755||1810||
|-
|Earl of Abingdon (1682)||Willoughby Bertie, 4th Earl of Abingdon||1760||1799||
|-
|Earl of Gainsborough (1682)||Henry Noel, 6th Earl of Gainsborough||1759||1798||
|-
|rowspan=2|Earl of Plymouth (1682)||Other Windsor, 4th Earl of Plymouth||1732||1771||Died
|-
|Other Windsor, 5th Earl of Plymouth||1771||1799||
|-
|Earl of Holderness (1682)||Robert Darcy, 4th Earl of Holderness||1722||1778||Died, title extinct
|-
|Earl of Scarbrough (1690)||Richard Lumley-Saunderson, 4th Earl of Scarbrough||1752||1782||
|-
|Earl of Rochford (1695)||William Nassau de Zuylestein, 4th Earl of Rochford||1738||1781||
|-
|rowspan=2|Earl of Albemarle (1697)||George Keppel, 3rd Earl of Albemarle||1754||1772||Died
|-
|William Keppel, 4th Earl of Albemarle||1772||1849||
|-
|Earl of Coventry (1697)||George Coventry, 6th Earl of Coventry||1751||1809||
|-
|Earl of Jersey (1697)||George Villiers, 4th Earl of Jersey||1769||1805||
|-
|Earl Poulett (1706)||Vere Poulett, 3rd Earl Poulett||1764||1788||
|-
|rowspan=2|Earl of Cholmondeley (1706)||George Cholmondeley, 3rd Earl of Cholmondeley||1733||1770||
|-
|George James Cholmondeley, 4th Earl of Cholmondeley||1770||1827||
|-
|colspan=5 style="background: #fcc" align="center"|Peerage of Scotland
|-
|Earl of Crawford (1398)||George Lindsay-Crawford, 21st Earl of Crawford||1749||1781||
|-
|rowspan=2|Earl of Erroll (1452)||James Hay, 15th Earl of Erroll||1758||1778||Died
|-
|George Hay, 16th Earl of Erroll||1778||1798||
|-
|Earl of Sutherland (1235)||Elizabeth Gordon, 19th Countess of Sutherland||1766||1839||
|-
|rowspan=2|Earl of Rothes (1458)||John Leslie, 11th Earl of Rothes||1767||1773||Died
|-
|Jane Elizabeth Leslie, 12th Countess of Rothes||1773||1810||
|-
|rowspan=2|Earl of Morton (1458)||Sholto Douglas, 15th Earl of Morton||1768||1774||Died
|-
|George Douglas, 16th Earl of Morton||1774||1827||
|-
|rowspan=2|Earl of Glencairn (1488)||William Cunningham, 13th Earl of Glencairn||1734||1775||Died
|-
|James Cunningham, 14th Earl of Glencairn||1775||1791||
|-
|Earl of Eglinton (1507)||Archibald Montgomerie, 11th Earl of Eglinton||1769||1796||
|-
|rowspan=2|Earl of Cassilis (1509)||Thomas Kennedy, 9th Earl of Cassilis||1759||1775||Died
|-
|David Kennedy, 10th Earl of Cassilis||1775||1792||
|-
|rowspan=2|Earl of Caithness (1455)||William Sinclair, 10th Earl of Caithness||1765||1779||Died
|-
|John Sinclair, 11th Earl of Caithness||1779||1789||
|-
|Earl of Buchan (1469)||David Erskine, 11th Earl of Buchan||1767||1829||
|-
|Earl of Moray (1562)||Francis Stuart, 9th Earl of Moray||1767||1810||
|-
|Earl of Home (1605)||Alexander Home, 9th Earl of Home||1761||1786||
|-
|Earl of Abercorn (1606)||James Hamilton, 8th Earl of Abercorn||1744||1789||
|-
|rowspan=2|Earl of Strathmore and Kinghorne (1606)||John Bowes, 9th Earl of Strathmore and Kinghorne||1753||1776||Died
|-
|John Bowes, 10th Earl of Strathmore and Kinghorne||1776||1820||
|-
|Earl of Kellie (1619)||Thomas Erskine, 6th Earl of Kellie||1758||1781||
|-
|Earl of Haddington (1619)||Thomas Hamilton, 7th Earl of Haddington||1735||1794||
|-
|rowspan=2|Earl of Galloway (1623)||Alexander Stewart, 6th Earl of Galloway||1746||1773||Died
|-
|John Stewart, 7th Earl of Galloway||1773||1806||
|-
|Earl of Lauderdale (1624)||James Maitland, 7th Earl of Lauderdale||1744||1789||
|-
|Earl of Loudoun (1633)||John Campbell, 4th Earl of Loudoun||1731||1782||
|-
|Earl of Kinnoull (1633)||Thomas Hay, 9th Earl of Kinnoull||1758||1787||
|-
|Earl of Dumfries (1633)||Patrick McDouall-Crichton, 6th Earl of Dumfries||1769||1803||
|-
|rowspan=3|Earl of Elgin (1633)||Charles Bruce, 5th Earl of Elgin||1747||1771||Died
|-
|William Robert Bruce, 6th Earl of Elgin||1771||1771||Died
|-
|Thomas Bruce, 7th Earl of Elgin||1771||1841||
|-
|rowspan=2|Earl of Traquair (1633)||John Stewart, 6th Earl of Traquair||1764||1779||Died
|-
|Charles Stewart, 7th Earl of Traquair||1779||1827||
|-
|Earl of Dalhousie (1633)||George Ramsay, 8th Earl of Dalhousie||1764||1787||
|-
|rowspan=2|Earl of Findlater (1638)||James Ogilvy, 6th Earl of Findlater||1764||1770||Died
|-
|James Ogilvy, 7th Earl of Findlater||1770||1811||
|-
|Earl of Leven (1641)||David Leslie, 6th Earl of Leven||1754||1802||
|-
|rowspan=2|Earl of Dysart (1643)||Lionel Tollemache, 4th Earl of Dysart||1727||1770||Died
|-
|Lionel Tollemache, 5th Earl of Dysart||1770||1799||
|-
|Earl of Selkirk (1646)||Dunbar Douglas, 4th Earl of Selkirk||1744||1799||
|-
|Earl of Northesk (1647)||George Carnegie, 6th Earl of Northesk||1741||1792||
|-
|Earl of Balcarres (1651)||Alexander Lindsay, 6th Earl of Balcarres||1768||1825||
|-
|Earl of Aboyne (1660)||Charles Gordon, 4th Earl of Aboyne||1732||1794||
|-
|Earl of Newburgh (1660)||James Radclyffe, 4th Earl of Newburgh||1755||1786||
|-
|rowspan=2|Earl of Dundonald (1669)||Thomas Cochrane, 8th Earl of Dundonald||1758||1778||Died
|-
|Archibald Cochrane, 9th Earl of Dundonald||1778||1831||
|-
|Earl of Kintore (1677)||Anthony Keith-Falconer, 5th Earl of Kintore||1778||1804||Revived after dormancy
|-
|Earl of Breadalbane and Holland (1677)||John Campbell, 3rd Earl of Breadalbane and Holland||1752||1782||
|-
|Earl of Aberdeen (1682)||George Gordon, 3rd Earl of Aberdeen||1746||1801||
|-
|Earl of Dunmore (1686)||John Murray, 4th Earl of Dunmore||1752||1809||
|-
|Earl of Orkney (1696)||Mary O'Brien, 3rd Countess of Orkney||1756||1790||
|-
|Earl of March (1697)||William Douglas, 3rd Earl of March||1731||1810||Succeeded to the Dukedom of Queensberry, see above
|-
|Earl of Marchmont (1697)||Hugh Hume-Campbell, 3rd Earl of Marchmont||1740||1794||
|-
|Earl of Hyndford (1701)||John Carmichael, 4th Earl of Hyndford||1766||1787||
|-
|Earl of Stair (1703)||John Dalrymple, 5th Earl of Stair||1768||1789||
|-
|Earl of Rosebery (1703)||Neil Primrose, 3rd Earl of Rosebery||1765||1814||
|-
|rowspan=2|Earl of Glasgow (1703)||John Boyle, 3rd Earl of Glasgow||1740||1775||Died
|-
|George Boyle, 4th Earl of Glasgow||1775||1843||
|-
|Earl of Portmore (1703)||Charles Colyear, 2nd Earl of Portmore||1730||1785||
|-
|Earl of Bute (1703)||John Stuart, 3rd Earl of Bute||1723||1792||
|-
|Earl of Hopetoun (1703)||John Hope, 2nd Earl of Hopetoun||1742||1781||
|-
|Earl of Deloraine (1706)||Henry Scott, 4th Earl of Deloraine||1740||1807||
|-
|colspan=5 style="background: #fcc" align="center"|Peerage of Great Britain
|-
|Earl of Oxford and Mortimer (1711)||Edward Harley, 4th Earl of Oxford and Earl Mortimer||1755||1790||
|-
|Earl of Strafford (1711)||William Wentworth, 2nd Earl of Strafford||1739||1791||
|-
|rowspan=2|Earl Ferrers (1711)||Washington Shirley, 5th Earl Ferrers||1760||1778||Died
|-
|Robert Shirley, 6th Earl Ferrers||1778||1787||
|-
|Earl of Dartmouth (1711)||William Legge, 2nd Earl of Dartmouth||1750||1801||
|-
|Earl of Tankerville (1714)||Charles Bennet, 4th Earl of Tankerville||1767||1822||
|-
|rowspan=2|Earl of Aylesford (1714)||Heneage Finch, 3rd Earl of Aylesford||1757||1777||Died
|-
|Heneage Finch, 4th Earl of Aylesford||1777||1812||
|-
|rowspan=3|Earl of Bristol (1714)||George Hervey, 2nd Earl of Bristol||1751||1775||Died
|-
|Augustus Hervey, 3rd Earl of Bristol||1775||1779||Died
|-
|Frederick Hervey, 4th Earl of Bristol||1779||1803||
|-
|Earl Granville (1715)||Robert Carteret, 3rd Earl Granville||1763||1776||Died; Peerage extinct
|-
|Earl of Halifax (1715)||George Montagu-Dunk, 2nd Earl of Halifax||1739||1771||Died; Peerage extinct
|-
|Earl of Sussex (1717)||Henry Yelverton, 3rd Earl of Sussex||1758||1799||
|-
||Earl Cowper (1718)||George Clavering-Cowper, 3rd Earl Cowper||1764||1789||
|-
|Earl Stanhope (1718)||Philip Stanhope, 2nd Earl Stanhope||1721||1786||
|-
|rowspan=2|Earl of Harborough (1719)||Bennet Sherard, 3rd Earl of Harborough||1750||1770||Died
|-
|Robert Sherard, 4th Earl of Harborough||1770||1799||
|-
|Earl of Macclesfield (1721)||Thomas Parker, 3rd Earl of Macclesfield||1764||1795||
|-
|Earl of Pomfret (1721)||George Fermor, 2nd Earl of Pomfret||1753||1785||
|-
|Countess of Walsingham (1722)||Melusina von der Schulenburg, Countess of Walsingham||1722||1778||Died; Peerage extinct
|-
|Earl Waldegrave (1729)||John Waldegrave, 3rd Earl Waldegrave||1763||1784||
|-
|Earl of Ashburnham (1730)||John Ashburnham, 2nd Earl of Ashburnham||1737||1812||
|-
|Earl of Effingham (1731)||Thomas Howard, 3rd Earl of Effingham||1763||1791||
|-
|Earl of Orford (1742)||George Walpole, 3rd Earl of Orford||1751||1791||
|-
|rowspan=2|Earl of Harrington (1742)||William Stanhope, 2nd Earl of Harrington||1756||1779||Died
|-
|Charles Stanhope, 3rd Earl of Harrington||1779||1829||
|-
|Earl of Portsmouth (1743)||John Wallop, 2nd Earl of Portsmouth||1762||1797||
|-
|rowspan=2|Earl Brooke (1746)||Francis Greville, 1st Earl Brooke||1746||1773||Died
|-
|George Greville, 2nd Earl Brooke||1773||1816||
|-
|Earl Gower (1746)||Granville Leveson-Gower, 2nd Earl Gower||1754||1803||
|-
|Earl of Buckinghamshire (1746)||John Hobart, 2nd Earl of Buckinghamshire||1756||1793||
|-
|Earl Fitzwilliam (1746)||William Fitzwilliam, 2nd Earl Fitzwilliam||1756||1833||
|-
|rowspan=2|Earl of Powis (1748)||Henry Herbert, 1st Earl of Powis||1748||1772||Died
|-
|George Herbert, 2nd Earl of Powis||1772||1801||
|-
|Earl of Egremont (1748)||George Wyndham, 3rd Earl of Egremont||1763||1837||
|-
|rowspan=2|Earl Temple (1749)||Richard Grenville-Temple, 2nd Earl Temple||1752||1779||Died
|-
|George Nugent-Temple-Grenville, 3rd Earl Temple||1779||1813||
|-
|rowspan=2|Earl Harcourt (1749)||Simon Harcourt, 1st Earl Harcourt||1749||1777||Died
|-
|George Harcourt, 2nd Earl Harcourt||1777||1809||
|-
|Earl of Hertford (1750)||Francis Seymour-Conway, 1st Earl of Hertford||1750||1794||
|-
|Earl of Guilford (1752)||Francis North, 1st Earl of Guilford||1752||1790||
|-
|Earl Cornwallis (1753)||Charles Cornwallis, 2nd Earl Cornwallis||1762||1805||
|-
|Earl of Hardwicke (1754)||Philip Yorke, 2nd Earl of Hardwicke||1764||1790||
|-
|Earl of Darlington (1754)||Henry Vane, 2nd Earl of Darlington||1758||1792||
|-
|rowspan=2|Earl Fauconberg (1756)||Thomas Belasyse, 1st Earl Fauconberg||1756||1774||Died
|-
|Henry Belasyse, 2nd Earl Fauconberg||1774||1802||
|-
|rowspan=2|Earl of Ilchester (1756)||Stephen Fox-Strangways, 1st Earl of Ilchester||1756||1776||Died
|-
|Henry Fox-Strangways, 2nd Earl of Ilchester||1776||1802||
|-
|rowspan=2|Earl De La Warr (1761)||John West, 2nd Earl De La Warr||1766||1777||Died
|-
|William West, 3rd Earl De La Warr||1777||1783||
|-
|Earl Talbot (1761)||William Talbot, 1st Earl Talbot||1761||1782||
|-
|rowspan=2|Earl of Northington (1764)||Robert Henley, 1st Earl of Northington||1764||1772||Died
|-
|Robert Henley, 2nd Earl of Northington||1772||1786||
|-
|rowspan=2|Earl of Radnor (1765)||William Bouverie, 1st Earl of Radnor||1765||1776||Died
|-
|Jacob Pleydell-Bouverie, 2nd Earl of Radnor||1776||1828||
|-
|Earl Spencer (1765)||John Spencer, 1st Earl Spencer||1765||1783||
|-
|rowspan=2|Earl of Chatham (1766)||William Pitt, 1st Earl of Chatham||1766||1778||Died
|-
|John Pitt, 2nd Earl of Chatham||1778||1835||
|-
|Earl Ligonier (1766)||John Ligonier, 1st Earl Ligonier||1766||1770||Died; title extinct
|-
|rowspan=2|Earl Bathurst (1772)||Allen Bathurst, 1st Earl Bathurst||1772||1775||New creation; died
|-
|Henry Bathurst, 2nd Earl Bathurst||1775||1794||
|-
|Earl of Hillsborough (1772)||Wills Hill, 1st Earl of Hillsborough||1772||1793||New creation
|-
|Earl of Ailesbury (1776)||Thomas Brudenell-Bruce, 1st Earl of Ailesbury||1776||1814||New creation
|-
|Earl of Clarendon (1776)||Thomas Villiers, 1st Earl of Clarendon||1776||1786||New creation
|-
|Earl of Mansfield (1776)||William Murray, 1st Earl of Mansfield||1776||1793||New creation
|-
|}

Viscounts

|colspan=5 style="background: #fcc" align="center"|Peerage of England
|-
|Viscount Hereford (1550)||Edward Devereux, 12th Viscount Hereford||1760||1783||
|-
|Viscount Montagu (1554)||Anthony Browne, 7th Viscount Montagu||1767||1787||
|-
|Viscount Saye and Sele (1624)||Richard Fiennes, 6th Viscount Saye and Sele||1742||1781||
|-
|Viscount Townshend (1682)||George Townshend, 4th Viscount Townshend||1764||1807||
|-
|Viscount Weymouth (1682)||Thomas Thynne, 3rd Viscount Weymouth||1751||1796||
|-
|colspan=5 style="background: #fcc" align="center"|Peerage of Scotland
|-
|Viscount of Falkland (1620)||Lucius Cary, 7th Viscount Falkland||1730||1785||
|-
|Viscount of Stormont (1621)||David Murray, 7th Viscount of Stormont||1748||1796||
|-
|Viscount of Arbuthnott (1641)||John Arbuthnot, 6th Viscount of Arbuthnott||1756||1791||
|-
|Viscount of Irvine (1661)||Charles Ingram, 9th Viscount of Irvine||1763||1778||Died; Peerage extinct
|-
|colspan=5 style="background: #fcc" align="center"|Peerage of Great Britain
|-
|Viscount Bolingbroke (1712)||Frederick St John, 2nd Viscount Bolingbroke||1751||1787||
|-
|Viscount Falmouth (1720)||Hugh Boscawen, 2nd Viscount Falmouth||1734||1782||
|-
|Viscount Torrington (1721)||George Byng, 4th Viscount Torrington||1750||1812||
|-
|rowspan=2|Viscount Leinster (1747)||James FitzGerald, 1st Viscount Leinster||1747||1773||Died; Duke of Leinster in the Peerage of Ireland
|-
|William FitzGerald, 2nd Viscount Leinster||1773||1804||Duke of Leinster in the Peerage of Ireland
|-
|Viscount Courtenay (1762)||William Courtenay, 2nd Viscount Courtenay||1762||1788||
|-
|rowspan=2|Viscount Wentworth (1762)||Edward Noel, 1st Viscount Wentworth||1762||1774||Died
|-
|Thomas Noel, 2nd Viscount Wentworth||1774||1815||
|-
|rowspan=2|Viscount Dudley and Ward (1763)||John Ward, 1st Viscount Dudley and Ward||1763||1774||Died
|-
|John Ward, 2nd Viscount Dudley and Ward||1774||1788||
|-
|rowspan=2|Viscount Maynard (1766)||Charles Maynard, 1st Viscount Maynard||1766||1775||Died
|-
|Charles Maynard, 2nd Viscount Maynard||1775||1824||
|-
|Viscount Hampden (1776)||Robert Hampden-Trevor, 1st Viscount Hampden||1776||1783||New creation
|-
|}

Barons

|colspan=5 style="background: #fcc" align="center"|Peerage of England
|-
|Baron le Despencer (1264)||Francis Dashwood, 11th Baron le Despencer||1763||1781||
|- 
|Baron Clinton (1299)||Margaret Rolle, 15th Baroness Clinton||1760||1781||
|- 
|rowspan=2|Baron Ferrers of Chartley (1299)||Charlotte Townshend, 16th Baroness Ferrers of Chartley||1749||1770||Died
|- 
|George Townshend, 17th Baron Ferrers of Chartley||1770||1811||
|- 
|rowspan=3|Baron de Clifford (1299)||Margaret Coke, 19th Baroness de Clifford||1734||1775||Died, Barony fell into abeyance
|- 
|Edward Southwell, 20th Baron de Clifford||1776||1777||Abeyance terminated
|- 
|Edward Southwell, 21st Baron de Clifford||1777||1832||
|- 
|Baron Botetourt (1305)||Norborne Berkeley, 4th Baron Botetourt||1764||1770||Died, Barony fell into abeyance
|- 
|Baron Audley (1313)||George Thicknesse, 19th Baron Audley||1777||1818||Barony previously held by the Earl of Castlehaven
|- 
|Baron Dacre (1321)||Thomas Barrett-Lennard, 17th Baron Dacre||1755||1786||
|- 
|Baron Stourton (1448)||William Stourton, 16th Baron Stourton||1753||1781||
|- 
|Baron Willoughby de Broke (1491)||John Peyto-Verney, 14th Baron Willoughby de Broke||1752||1816||
|- 
|rowspan=2|Baron Willoughby of Parham (1547)||Henry Willoughby, 16th Baron Willoughby of Parham||1767||1775||Died
|-
|George Willoughby, 17th Baron Willoughby of Parham||1775||1779||Died, title extinct
|-
|Baron Paget (1552)||Henry Paget, 9th Baron Paget||1769||1812||
|-
|Baron St John of Bletso (1559)||Henry St John, 13th Baron St John of Bletso||1767||1805||
|-
|Baron Petre (1603)||Robert Petre, 9th Baron Petre||1742||1801||
|-
|Baron Arundell of Wardour (1605)||Henry Arundell, 8th Baron Arundell of Wardour||1756||1808||
|-
|Baron Dormer (1615)||John Dormer, 7th Baron Dormer||1761||1785||
|-
|Baron Teynham (1616)||Henry Roper, 10th Baron Teynham||1727||1781||
|-
|Baron Craven (1627)||William Craven, 6th Baron Craven||1769||1791||
|-
|Baron Strange (1628)||Charlotte Murray, 8th Baroness Strange||1764||1805||
|-
|Baron Leigh (1643)||Edward Leigh, 5th Baron Leigh||1749||1786||
|-
|Baron Byron (1643)||William Byron, 5th Baron Byron||1736||1798||
|-
|rowspan=2|Baron Langdale (1658)||Marmaduke Langdale, 4th Baron Langdale||1718||1771||Died
|-
|Marmaduke Langdale, 5th Baron Langdale||1771||1777||Died, title extinct
|-
|Baron Berkeley of Stratton (1658)||John Berkeley, 5th Baron Berkeley of Stratton||1741||1773||Died, title extinct
|-
|Baron Delamer (1661)||Nathaniel Booth, 4th Baron Delamer||1758||1770||Died, title extinct
|-
|Baron Clifford of Chudleigh (1672)||Hugh Clifford, 4th Baron Clifford of Chudleigh||1732||1783||
|-
|rowspan=2|Baron Willoughby of Parham (1680)||Henry Willoughby, 16th Baron Willoughby of Parham||1767||1775||Died
|-
|George Willoughby, 17th Baron Willoughby of Parham||1775||1779||Died, title extinct
|-
|colspan=5 style="background: #fcc" align="center"|Peerage of Scotland
|-
|Lord Somerville (1430)||James Somerville, 14th Lord Somerville||1765||1796||
|-
|Lord Forbes (1442)||James Forbes, 16th Lord Forbes||1761||1804||
|-
|Lord Saltoun (1445)||George Fraser, 15th Lord Saltoun||1748||1781||
|-
|Lord Gray (1445)||John Gray, 11th Lord Gray||1738||1782||
|-
|Lord Borthwick (1452)||Henry Borthwick, 14th Lord Borthwick||1762||1772||Died, peerage dormant
|-
|rowspan=2|Lord Cathcart (1460)||Charles Cathcart, 9th Lord Cathcart||1740||1776||Died
|-
|William Cathcart, 10th Lord Cathcart||1776||1843||
|-
|Lord Sempill (1489)||John Sempill, 13th Lord Sempill||1746||1782||
|-
|Lord Elphinstone (1509)||Charles Elphinstone, 10th Lord Elphinstone||1757||1781||
|-
|Lord Torphichen (1564)||James Sandilands, 9th Lord Torphichen||1765||1815||
|-
|rowspan=2|Lord Lindores (1600)||James Francis Leslie, 7th Lord Lindores||1765||1775||
|-
|John Leslie, 8th Lord Lindores||1775||1813||
|-
|rowspan=2|Lord Colville of Culross (1604)||Alexander Colville, 7th Lord Colville of Culross||1741||1770||Died
|-
|John Colville, 8th Lord Colville of Culross||1770||1811||
|-
|rowspan=2|Lord Blantyre (1606)||William Stuart, 9th Lord Blantyre||1751||1776||Died
|-
|Alexander Stuart, 10th Lord Blantyre||1776||1783||
|-
|rowspan=3|Lord Cranstoun (1609)||James Cranstoun, 6th Lord Cranstoun||1727||1773||Died
|-
|William Cranstoun, 7th Lord Cranstoun||1773||1778||Died
|-
|James Cranstoun, 8th Lord Cranstoun||1778||1796||
|-
|Lord Aston of Forfar (1627)||Walter Aston, 8th Lord Aston of Forfar||1763||1805||
|-
|Lord Fairfax of Cameron (1627)||Thomas Fairfax, 6th Lord Fairfax of Cameron||1710||1781||
|-
|rowspan=3|Lord Napier (1627)||Francis Napier, 6th Lord Napier||1706||1773||Died
|-
|William Napier, 7th Lord Napier||1773||1775||Died
|-
|Francis Napier, 8th Lord Napier||1775||1823||
|-
|Lord Reay (1628)||Hugh Mackay, 6th Lord Reay||1768||1797||
|-
|Lord Kirkcudbright (1633)||John Maclellan, 8th Lord Kirkcudbright||1762||1801||
|-
|Lord Forrester (1633)||Caroline Cockburn of Ormistoun, 8th Lady Forrester||1763||1784||
|-
|rowspan=2|Lord Banff (1642)||Alexander Ogilvy, 7th Lord Banff||1746||1771||Died
|-
|William Ogilvy, 8th Lord Banff||1771||1803||
|-
|rowspan=2|Lord Elibank (1643)||Patrick Murray, 5th Lord Elibank||1736||1778||Died
|-
|George Murray, 6th Lord Elibank||1778||1785||
|-
|rowspan=2|Lord Falconer of Halkerton (1646)||William Falconer, 6th Lord Falconer of Halkerton||1762||1776||Died
|-
|Anthony Keith-Falconer, 7th Lord Falconer of Halkerton||1776||1804||Claimed the Earldom of Kintore in 1778, see above
|-
|rowspan=2|Lord Belhaven and Stenton (1647)||James Hamilton, 5th Lord Belhaven and Stenton||1764||1777||Died
|-
|Robert Hamilton, 6th Lord Belhaven and Stenton||1777||1784||
|-
|Lord Rollo (1651)||John Rollo, 6th Lord Rollo||1763||1783||
|-
|Lord Ruthven of Freeland (1650)||Isobel Ruthven, 4th Lady Ruthven of Freeland||1722||1783||
|-
|Lord Bellenden (1661)||John Ker Bellenden, 5th Lord Bellenden||1753||1796||
|-
|Lord Kinnaird (1682)||George Kinnaird, 7th Lord Kinnaird||1767||1805||
|-
|}

References

 

1770
1770s in England
1770s in Ireland
1770s in Scotland
Peers
Peers
Peers
Peers
Peers
Peers
18th-century nobility